Shamim Ahamed Roni (born 24 October 1986) is a Bangladeshi film director and screenwriter.

Filmography 
The first film directed by Roni is Mental, which was released on 2016. In addition to directing the film, Roni wrote the screenplay. The young producer made his directorial debut at BFDC through this film.

The following is a list of films directed by Roni—
 Mental (2016) 
 Bossgiri (2016)
 Dhat Teri Ki (2017)
 Rangbaz (2017)
 Shahenshah (2020)
 August 1975 (2021)
 Bikkhov (2022)
 Commando (unreleased)
 Tungiparar Miya Bhai (2021)
 Live (2022)
 Khoto (Upcoming)
 Norsundori (Upcoming)
 Chakkor (Upcoming)
 Agnibina (Upcoming)
 Dhadha (Upcoming)
 Chuti (Upcoming)
 Bubujaan (Upcoming)
 Bank Draft (Upcoming) 
 Manob Danob (Upcoming)
 Ebar Tora Manush Ho  (Upcoming)

References

External links 
 

Living people
1986 births
Place of birth missing (living people)
Bangladeshi film directors